Nadezhda-Mey Nguen (Bulgarian: Надежда Нгуен; born ) is a Bulgarian weightlifter, most recently competing in the 45 kg division at the 2021 European Weightlifting Championships.

Career
She won the gold medal at the 2021 European Weightlifting Championships in the 45 kg division.

At the 2021 European Junior & U23 Weightlifting Championships in Rovaniemi, Finland, she won the silver medal in her event.

Major results

References

Living people
2000 births
Bulgarian female weightlifters
European Weightlifting Championships medalists
21st-century Bulgarian women